The New Castle Ice Piers are historic ice breaks located at New Castle in New Castle County, Delaware.  The seven stone piers were constructed between 1803 and 1882. Each pier consists of an outer shell of finished granite blocks with an inner core of rubble.

They were added to the National Register of Historic Places in 1982. The ice piers have also been designated as a National Historic Civil Engineering Landmark by the American Society of Civil Engineers.

References

Buildings and structures on the National Register of Historic Places in Delaware
Infrastructure completed in 1882
Buildings and structures in New Castle, Delaware
National Register of Historic Places in New Castle County, Delaware
Historic Civil Engineering Landmarks